The New York City Police Department Medal of Honor is the highest law enforcement medal of the New York City Police Department. The Medal of Honor is awarded for individual acts of extraordinary bravery performed in the line of duty at extreme risk and danger to life.

The present NYPD Medal of Honor was created on October 23, 1973. Early versions of the decoration date as far back as 1871, when the Medal of Honor was known by a variety of names such as the "Police Silver Medal" and "Gold Medal of Valor". That medal was a silver or gold medal, either of which could be awarded at the discretion of the police commissioners, in the shape of the then shield of the department. On the obverse are the arms of the City of New York, the names of the police commissioners, and the words "Municipal Police". On the reverse is an inscription describing the act for which the medal was awarded. Later that medal was changed to a silver medal in the shape of a police shield. On the obverse is the figure of a draped female placing a wreath upon the head of a police officer. On the reverse is an inscription of the act of bravery and the names of the city's commissioners. The medal hangs from a ring and suspender on which the letters "NY" are interlocked (the current logo of the New York Yankees is based on this element of the Tiffany-designed medal) and attached to a top bar that is inscribed with the word "valor".  The stars on the green ribbon suspender commemorate the city's original 12 police constables, who began to patrol in the 1700s. 

The "Police Silver Medal" and "Gold Medal of Valor" was first awarded on August 17, 1871 to Patrolman Bernard Tull of the 19th Precinct who arrested a burglar after being shot at. It was last awarded on January 21, 1884.

The New York City Police Department Medal of Honor was created in 1912 and was awarded until 1972, when it was redesigned.

The New York City Police Department also maintains a Medal of Valor, presented for acts of bravery above the call of duty but not at the level required for the Medal of Honor, and the Combat Cross for life-threatening armed engagements with criminals, in addition to a wide variety of other medals.

Notable recipients 
 John Cordes, the first detective to be awarded the Medal twice (1923 and 1927)
 Frank Serpico (awarded in 1972)

See also 

 Medals of the New York City Police Department
 New York City Police Department Medal for Valor
 New York City Police Department Combat Cross

References 

Medal of Honor
Awards established in 1973
1973 establishments in New York City